Angola International Airport (IATA: none, ICAO: none) is an international airport currently under-construction, which will serve the capital of Angola, Luanda. It is located in Bengo Province, 40 km southeast of the city center. It will be an alternative to the existing Quatro de Fevereiro International Airport. Along with some Chinese contractors, the Brazilian company, Odebrecht, are constructing the airport. The first phase was completed in 2012. The airport was originally scheduled to completed and opened in 2015/2016, but due to delays caused by problems within the company and the COVID-19 pandemic, the opening was delayed until 2022. The airport is now expected to be completed by the end of 2023.

Design and construction
The airport will be having the capacity to serve 13 million passengers per year. The lead construction company is China International Fund, which was founded in Hong Kong in 2003. The company built a village named Vila Chinesa, meaning "Chinese village", for the accommodation of workers and material depots, east of Luanda in Viana.

The passenger terminal occupies 160,00 sq.m, while the cargo terminal is 6,200 sq.m., with an annual capacity of 35,000 tonnes of cargo. Two parallel runways are built. The northern runway is 4,200 meters long, while the southern runway is 3,800 meters long, both measuring 60 meters in width. The airport's site was finalised in 2004, and construction began in mid-2006. Work was suspended at the end of 2007, due to financial revaluation by the Angolan government. The construction costs, which are financed entirely by China, were estimated at US$3,8 billion (2015). Complementary infrastructure, such as shops, hangars, restaurants, offices and a nearby hotel are not included. The airport's total area is 50 sq.km.

The project includes the construction of a rail link to the capital, to the province of Luanda and possibly to the neighboring province of Malanje. Due to high traffic jams and in order to cope with the future traffic, the highway connection to Luanda required that the existing road from Luanda to Malanje needs a mass expansion, which is now completed, and is converted as a six-lane and four-lane highway.

As of June 2022, the airport is expected to be completed and opened by the end of 2023, as declared by the Angolan Government as the latest update of the airport's status.

References

External links 
 Homepage China International Fund Limited (en)
 First images published of new Luanda Airport 28 March 2009
 Report Angonoticias (pt)
 Angola Acontece (pt)
 Minister: New Airport works delayed 15. November 2007
Angola International Airport Google Maps, March 2013

Airports in Angola
Proposed airports in Africa